Bernard Weiss may refer to:

 Bernard G. Weiss (1933–2018), professor emeritus of languages and literature at University of Utah
 Bernard Weish or Bernard Weiss, a fictional linguist